Events in the year 1983 in Brazil.

Incumbents

Federal government
 President: General João Figueiredo
 Vice President: Aureliano Chaves

Governors 
 Acre: Nabor Júnior
 Alagoas: Divaldo Suruagy 
 Amazonas: Gilberto Mestrinho 
 Bahia: Antônio Carlos Magalhães then João Durval Carneiro 
 Ceará: Manuel de Castro (until 15 March); Gonzaga Mota (from 15 March)
 Espírito Santo: Eurico Vieira Resende (until 15 March); Gerson Camata (from 15 March)
 Goiás: Ary Valadão (until 15 March); Iris Rezende (from 15 March)
 Maranhão: Ivar Saldanha (until 15 March); Luís Rocha (from 15 March)
 Mato Grosso: Frederico Campos then Julio Campos 
 Mato Grosso do Sul: Pedro Pedrossian (until 1 March); Wilson Barbosa Martins (from 1 March)
 Minas Gerais: Francelino Pereira (until 15 March); Tancredo Neves (from 15 March)
 Pará: Alacid Nunes (until 15 March); Jader Barbalho (from 15 March)
 Paraíba: Clóvis Cavalcanti (until 15 March); Wilson Braga (from 15 March)	 
 Paraná: José Hosken de Novais then José Richa
 Pernambuco: José Muniz Ramos (until 15 March); Roberto Magalhães (from 15 March) 
 Piauí: Lucídio Portela (until 15 March); Hugo Napoleão (from 15 March)
 Rio de Janeiro: Antônio Chagas Freitas then Leonel Brizola
 Rio Grande do Norte: Lavoisier Maia (until 15 March); José Agripino Maia (from 15 March)
 Rio Grande do Sul: José Augusto Amaral de Souza (until 15 March); Jair de Oliveira Soares (from 15 March)
 Rondônia: Jorge Teixeira de Oliveira 
 Santa Catarina: Henrique Córdova (until 15 March); Esperidião Amin (from 15 March)
 São Paulo: José Maria Marin (until 15 March); André Franco Montoro (from 15 March)
 Sergipe: Djenal Queirós (until 15 March); João Alves Filho (from 15 March)

Vice governors
 Acre: José Fernandes Rego (until 15 March); Iolanda Ferreira Lima Fleming (from 15 March)
 Alagoas: José de Medeiros Tavares (from 15 March)
 Amazonas: Manoel Henriques Ribeiro (from 15 March)
 Bahia: Luis Viana Neto (until 15 March); Edvaldo de Oliveira Flores (from 15 March)
 Ceará: José Adauto Bezerra (from 15 March)
 Espírito Santo: José Carlos Fonseca (until 31 January); José Moraes (from 15 March)
 Goiás: Rui Brasil Cavalcanti  (from 15 March); Onofre Quinan (from 15 March)
 Maranhão: João Rodolfo Ribeiro Gonçalves (from 15 March)
 Mato Grosso: José Vilanova Torres (until 15 March); Wilmar Peres de Faria (from 15 March)
 Mato Grosso do Sul: Ramez Tebet (from 15 March)
 Minas Gerais: João Marques de Vasconcelos (until 15 March); Hélio Garcia (from 15 March)
 Pará: Gerson dos Santos Peres (until 31 January); Laércio Dias Franco (from 15 March)
 Paraíba: José Carlos da Silva Júnior (from 15 March)
 Paraná: João Elísio Ferraz de Campos (from 15 March)
 Pernambuco: Waldemar de Castro Macedo (until 15 March); Gustavo Krause Gonçalves Sobrinho (from 15 March)
 Piauí: José Raimundo Bona Medeiros 
 Rio de Janeiro: Hamilton Xavier (until 15 March); Darcy Ribeiro (starting 15 March)
 Rio Grande do Norte: Geraldo Melo (until 15 March); Radir Pereira (from 15 March)
 Rio Grande do Sul: Otávio Badui Germano (until 15 March); Cláudio Ênio Strassburger (from 15 March)
 Santa Catarina: Henrique Hélion Velho de Córdova (until 15 March); Victor Fontana (from 15 March)
 São Paulo: Orestes Quércia (from 15 March)
 Sergipe: Antônio Carlos Valadares (from 15 March)

Events 
March 13 - The 1983 Brazilian Grand Prix is held at Jacarepaguá and is won by Brazil's Nelson Piquet.
June 5 – Rede Manchete is founded in São Paulo. It was defunct in 1999.
July 24-August 6 - The 1983 FIBA World Basketball Championship for Women is hosted by Brazil. It is won by the Soviet Union.
 December 19 – The original Jules Rimet Trophy, awarded to Brazil in 1930, is stolen from Rio de Janeiro; it has never been recovered.

Births
January 12 - Prince Pedro Luiz of Orléans-Braganza (died 2009)
January 13 - Bill Hudson, Brazilian-American musician 
January 28 - Sandy, singer
April 15 - Alice Braga, actress
August 15 - Jancarlos de Oliveira Barros, footballer (died 2013)
August 31 - Maria Flor, actress
October 15 - Bruno Senna, racing driver

Deaths 
October 5 - Humberto Mauro, film director, 86

References

See also 
Brazilian football
1983 in Brazilian television
List of Brazilian films of 1983

 
1980s in Brazil
Years of the 20th century in Brazil
Brazil
Brazil